Anisoptera costata is an endangered species of plant in the family Dipterocarpaceae. The specific epithet costata means "ribbed", referring to the prominent venation of the leaf blade. A huge emergent tree up to 65 m high, it is found in evergreen and semi-evergreen lowland tropical seasonal forests of Indo-Burma and in mixed dipterocarp forests of Malesia.

Distribution and habitat
Anisoptera costata is native to Bangladesh, Borneo, Sumatra, Java, Cambodia, Laos, Peninsular Malaysia, Myanmar, the Philippines, Thailand, and Vietnam. In Laos, the tree grows along rivers.

Benefit 
The Anisoptera costata, and Dalvergia cochinchinesis are six-year-old native species for the forest plantation strategy to increase biomass, forest ecosystems, timber supply, and socio-economic. It is important to environmental, and biodiversity purpose with improving soil condition in the forest.

Fruit and Flower Characteristics. 
Anisopertera costata fruits or nuts have the size of broadly conical longer wing is 9-12 by 1.4-1.8 cm., and shorter wing:1,2-1.5 by 0.2-0.35. The flower characteristic is white-yellow flowers, the length is 6 mm. This flower is the food for the insect, and moth such as the red coffe borer (Zeuszera).

References

External links 
 
 

costata
Trees of Bangladesh
Trees of Indo-China
Trees of Malesia
Taxonomy articles created by Polbot